While the Billy Boils is a 1921 Australian film from director Beaumont Smith which adapts several stories from Henry Lawson. It is considered a lost film.

Plot
Bob Brothers (Tal Ordell) is a bushman who quarrelled with his father ten years earlier, left him and changed his name. He returns to his father's station and takes a job there, eventually becoming the union representative of the station hands. His younger brother Dick (Robert MacKinnon) is being blackmailed by the evil Tessie (Lorna Lantaur) into stealing money. Bob takes the blame to protect his brother.

Dick and Bob both fall in love with Ruth. Bob tries to forget her by going out back and almost dies in the desert, but is rescued by an Afghan camel driver. He returns home and is blamed for another robbery, but is cleared of the charges and is united with Ruth.

Cast
Tal Ordell as Bob Brothers
John Cosgrove as One-eyed Bogan
Robert MacKinnon as Dick ebb
Ernest T. Hearne as Steelman
Gilbert Emery as Smithy
J. P. O'Neill as Tom Mitchell
Charles Beetham as Tom Wall
Alf Scarlett as bank manager
Elsie McCormick as Ruth
Lorna Lantaur as Tessie Brand
Rita Aslin as Mrs Stiffner
May Renne as Mrs Brighten
James Ward as Old Tallyho
Charles Villers as Andy Regan
Henry Lawson as himself

Production
Beaumont Smith had previously adapted Lawson's for the stage in 1916, and it toured Australia for that and the following year. Members of the cast for the play appeared in Smith's debut feature, Our Friends, the Hayseeds (1917).

Smith shot and edited the film from July to August 1921 in and around Windsor and Redclay in New South Wales. His assistant director was Phil K. Walsh, who later directed two Australian films, Around the Boree Log and The Birth of White Australia. Lawson himself appears in a brief prologue.

Lawson had given all copyright in his work to Angus & Robertson, but its principal, George Robertson, agreed the money for the rights to the movie should go to Lawson, which became the author's main source of income in the last years of his life.

Reception
Commercial results were strong.

References

External links
While the Billy Boils in the Internet Movie Database
While the Billy Boils at National Film and Sound Archive

1921 films
Films directed by Beaumont Smith
Lost Australian films
Australian silent feature films
Australian black-and-white films